Shane Robinson (born 17 December 1980) is an Irish retired footballer who last played for Shamrock Rovers in the League of Ireland.

Career

Shane signed for Shamrock Rovers in 1999 and made a scoring debut. His first month in the league he was awarded Player of the Month. He went on to play for six seasons, making five appearances in European competition. He was Player of the Year for the 2001/02 season.

He signed for Drogheda United in the 2005 close season He scored Drogheda's first-ever goal in European competition. He also scored for Drogheda in the Champions League qualifier at Dynamo Kiev on 7 August 2008. He was an instrumental part in Drogheda Uniteds huge success during his time their, helping the club win the league, the FAI cup and the Setanta cup twice.

After four years of trophies at United Park, he signed back for Rovers in January 2009 and captained the first Rovers side to play in Tallaght Stadium and also captained Rovers in their high-profile friendly against Real Madrid in July 2009.

Having finished second in the league, he parted company at the end of the 2009 season and moved to Australia, where he played one season with Stirling Lions in the Football West state league. That season he helped Stirling Lions win the cup and won the League's best player.

He returned to Europe signing with FC Haka in 2011 scoring seven goals in his first season in Finnish football and winning the supporters' choice for Player of the Year. He won the supporters' choice for Player of the Year again in the 2012 season.

He returned to Rovers for the 2013 League of Ireland season. Robinson retired after the 2014 season and now looks after the Shamrock Rovers schoolboy setup.

Honours

Club
Drogheda United
 League of Ireland (1): 2007
 FAI Cup (1): 2005
 Setanta Sports Cup (2): 2006, 2007

Shamrock Rovers
 Setanta Sports Cup (1): 2013
 Leinster Senior Cup (1): 2013

Individual
Shamrock Rovers Player of the Year (1): 2001/02
Haka supporters Player of the Year (2): 2011, 2012

References

1980 births
Living people
Association footballers from County Waterford
Republic of Ireland association footballers
Association football midfielders
League of Ireland players
Shamrock Rovers F.C. players
Drogheda United F.C. players
FC Haka players
Veikkausliiga players
Republic of Ireland expatriate association footballers
Expatriate footballers in Finland